This is a list of numbered highways in the province of Nova Scotia.

Arterial (100-series) highways 

A 100-series highway is a designation applied to a highway that can be a controlled-access expressway, Super-2, or fully divided freeway.  The designation can also be applied in some cases to sections of uncontrolled access roads which are deemed strategically important and which will be upgraded in the future to controlled-access.

Trunk Highways
Nova Scotia's original arterial highway number system had route number signs in the same shape as the U.S. Highway route number signs. These signs are now used for Trunk routes. Former, "missing", Trunk routes were largely downgraded to Collector Routes in 1970.

Collector Highways

Scenic Routes

References 

Nova Scotia provincial highways
 
Highways